The 2018–19 Columbia Lions men's basketball team represented Columbia University in the 2018–19 NCAA Division I men's basketball season. They played their home games at Levien Gymnasium in New York City and were led by third-year head coach Jim Engles, as members of the Ivy League. They finished the season 10–18, 5–9 in Ivy League play to finish in seventh place. They failed to qualify for the Ivy League tournament.

Previous season
The Lions finished the 2017–18 season 8–19, 5–9 in Ivy League play to finish in a tie for fifth place and failed to qualify for the Ivy League tournament.

Roster

Schedule and results

|-
!colspan=12 style=| Non-Conference Regular season

|-
!colspan=9 style=| Ivy League regular season

|-

Source

See also
 2018–19 Columbia Lions women's basketball team

References

Columbia Lions men's basketball seasons
Columbia Lions
Columbia Lions men's basketball team
Columbia Lions men's basketball team